Ross Clark (born 12 September 1966) is a British journalist and author whose work has appeared in The Spectator, The Times and other publications. He is the author of several books, including How to Label a Goat: the silly Rules and Regulations that are strangling Britain and The Great Before, a novel which satirised the pessimism of the Green movement. He is a frequent critic of British government policy, especially on its interventions in the housing market.

Early life 

Clark was born in Worcester and brought up in East Kent, where he attended the Simon Langton Grammar School for Boys. He studied at Trinity Hall, Cambridge.

Career 

In 1989, Clark won The Spectator Young Writers Award, part of the prize for which – a lunch — he later claimed not to have received.   He established himself as a freelance journalist, with his work appearing in The Daily Telegraph and Sunday Telegraph, the Daily Express, the Daily Mail and The Mail on Sunday and The Times, where he frequently writes the Thunderer column. His work is strongly associated with libertarianism and free market economics, writing the "Banned Wagon" and "Globophobia" columns in The Spectator. In 2013, he was co-winner of the Bastiat Prize run by the Reason Foundation.  He was also shortlisted for the prize in 2004.

In 2010, shortly before the general election, he co-wrote, with Neil O'Brien, The Renewal of Government, the manifesto of  Policy Exchange, a think tank strongly associated with David Cameron. However, since then he has shown hostility towards Coalition policies; in a piece in The Times in March 2013, he accused the Chancellor, George Osborne, by means of a plan to underwrite £130 billion of mortgage debt, of forcing the taxpayer to take the same speculative risks which had caused the banking crisis.

In 2012, Clark's musical Shot at Dawn was performed as a workshop at the Etcetera Theatre in Camden. The musical was a success and was later restaged as a full-scale professional production in 2014 at Upstairs at The Gatehouse in Highgate, north London and the Mumford Theatre, Cambridge. He also wrote, with Martin Coslett, The Perfect City, which was performed at the Etcetera Theatre in March 2013. In 2015, the musical Shot at Dawn was renamed The White Feather and performed at the Union Theatre in Southwark.

Personal
He lives in Reach, Cambridgeshire.  In 2011 he was elected to be a member of the village's parish council.

Books 
 
 
 
 
 
 
 
 
   Clark, Ross (2023)    Not Zero: How an Irrational Target Will Impoverish You, Help China (and Won't Even Save the Planet)   Forum Press  ISBN 978 1800752429   https://swiftpress.com/book/not-zero/

References 

1966 births
Living people
Alumni of Trinity Hall, Cambridge
British libertarians